Mercyline Chelangat (born 17 December 1997) is a Ugandan long distance runner. She competed in the women's 10,000 metres at the 2017 World Championships in Athletics. In 2018, she competed in the senior women's race at the 2018 African Cross Country Championships held in Chlef, Algeria.

In June 2021, she qualified to represent Uganda at the 2020 Summer Olympics.

References

External links
 

1997 births
Living people
Ugandan female long-distance runners
World Athletics Championships athletes for Uganda
Place of birth missing (living people)
Ugandan mountain runners
Commonwealth Games bronze medallists for Uganda
Commonwealth Games medallists in athletics
Athletes (track and field) at the 2018 Commonwealth Games
Athletes (track and field) at the 2020 Summer Olympics
Olympic athletes of Uganda
21st-century Ugandan women
Medallists at the 2018 Commonwealth Games